Kent Tong (born 29 September 1958) is a Hong Kong actor. He was a popular TVB actor during the 1980s, nicknamed "Prince" and one of the "Five Tiger Generals" of TVB.

Early life
Kent Tong was born to and grew up in a poor family in Hong Kong. His father was a fisherman who always caught seafood to feed his family. All 12 members of his family lived in a small-sized  living room that was only 30 square meters. After graduating from high school, he worked on a salary of around 500 Hong Kong dollars per month.

Career
In 1979, Kent Tong received actor training from the TVB Artist Training Class, and proceeded to act for TVB. Although he has appeared in over a dozen movies, he is mostly known for his work in TVB television series, such as Duen Yu in Demi-Gods and Semi-Devils (1982) and Yin Ching in The Unyielding Master Lim (1986). Tong often undertook roles of princes and villains in TVB dramas.

During the 1980s, Kent Tong, along with Tony Leung Chiu-Wai, Andy Lau, Michael Miu and Felix Wong became known as the Five Tiger Generals of TVB. They were widely considered the most popular and best looking leading male actors in TVB at the time. Everyone called him a nickname "Prince" – the most handsome guy in the group. In 1985, Tong was blamed by the public for the suicide of his then girlfriend, actress Barbara Yung, suffering a nervous breakdown as a result. At the end of 1985, he left TVB to avoid more negativity.

In 1993, he married former ATV actress Jiang Kun from China, who bore him a daughter and twin sons. However, while he and Jiang Kun were in the midst of their divorce, Kent was in a relationship with another woman from Guangzhou, their son was born in 2000. The couple officially divorced in 2001. In 2008, he married Qingdao native Zou Wenjing, who is 25 years his junior. Their twin girls were born in 2008. 

From between the 1990s and now, Tong had switched to develop his food business and also shoot films in China. Tong is appointed as a member of the National Committee of the Chinese People's Political Consultative Conference representing Guangdong Province since December 2007. In 2015, Tong made a comeback to TVB after 30 years with big success of the blockbuster Lord of Shanghai. Besides, he was nominated for Best Actor of the year.

Filmography

Television

Films
Once Upon a Rainbow (1982)
Hell Has No Boundary (1982)
Nomad (1982)
Demi-Gods and Semi-Devils (1982)
Red Spell Spells Red (1983)
Maybe It's Love (1984)
The Surgeon (1984)
Police Story (1985)
The Story of Dr. Sun Yat Sen (1986)
Eastern Condors (1987)
You OK, I'm OK (1987)
Call Girl '88 (1988)
The Dragon Family (1988)
Bitter Taste of Blood (1988)
City Cops (1989)
The Tigers (1991) – Best Supporting Actor Nomination for The Tigers (11th Hong Kong Film Awards)
Pretty Woman (1991)
Take Me (1991)
Fox Legend (1991)
The Days of Being Dumb (1992)
The Pearl of Oriental (1992)
Royal Tramp II (1992)
Sex And Curse (1992)
Sisters in Law (1992)
A Matter of Life or Death (1992)
Hero of Hong Kong 1949 (1993)
Lord of the East China Sea (1993)
Hero – Beyond The Boundary of Time (1993)
The Tale of a Heroine (1993)
Bogus Cops (1993)
Hot Desire (1993)
Dancing Boy in Underworld Street (1993)
Pink Panther (1993)
Battle of No Truce (1993)
A Man and a Woman (1993)
Naked Rose (1994)
Bloody Beast (1994)
Possessed (1994)
Reunion (2002)
Eternal Flame of Fatal Attraction (2003)
My Jail Story (2003)
Moving Targets (2004)
Love is a Many Stupid Thing (2004)
Dragon Squad (2005)
My Mother is a Belly Dancer (2006)
Brothers (2007)
The Scroll of Wing Chun White Crane (2014)
Silently Love (2015)
Doomed Disaster (2015)
Out of Ordinary (2016)
Xuan Zang (2016)
Chasing the Dragon (2017)
Agent Mr Chan (2018)
Our Time (2018)
Dragon Action Secret Code (2019)

Variety show

References

External links

 
Kent Tong at kenttong.com 

1958 births
Living people
Hong Kong male film actors
Hong Kong male television actors
20th-century Hong Kong male actors
21st-century Hong Kong male actors